Parc 55 San Francisco - a Hilton Hotel is a  skyscraper hotel located in Tenderloin, San Francisco, California.

History
The Ramada Renaissance Hotel opened in October 1984. Ramada Renaissance was the upscale division of Ramada Inns. The hotel was sold to Oakland developer Larry Chan's Park Lane Hotels in 1989 and renamed the Parc 55 Hotel. On April 30, 1998, the hotel was reflagged as Renaissance Parc 55 Hotel. Renaissance Hotels had separated from Ramada in 1989 and been purchased by Marriott in 1997. The hotel became Marriott's 1500th property worldwide. Boston-based Rockpoint Group and Dallas-based Highgate Holdings bought the hotel from Park Lane Hotels in 2006 for $170 million. The hotel left Marriott on January 15, 2007, and became the Parc 55 Hotel again. In April 2010, the hotel joined Wyndham Hotels and was renamed Parc 55 Wyndham San Francisco - Union Square. In 2012, The Blackstone Group took 75 percent ownership of the hotel. In February 2015, Hilton Worldwide bought the property and renamed it Parc 55 San Francisco - a Hilton Hotel. The building is valued at $512.2 million (2018).

References

San Francisco Union Square
Hotel buildings completed in 1984
Hotels established in 1984
Skyscraper hotels in San Francisco
Tenderloin, San Francisco
1984 establishments in California